Tilden is a surname of English origin. Spelling variants include Tildon, Tileden, Tillden, and Tylden. The name may refer to:

Barbara Tilden (born 1955), New Zealand field hockey player
Bill Tilden (1893–1953), American tennis player 
Brad Tilden (born 1961), American businessman
Charles Lee Tilden (1857–1950), American lawyer and businessman
Charles Lee Tilden, Jr. (1894–1968), American rugby player
Charles William Tilden (1832-1914), Col 16th Maine Volunteer Infantry at Gettysburg
Daniel R. Tilden (1804–1890), American politician
Douglas Tilden (1861–1935), American sculptor 
Freeman Tilden (1883–1980), American preservationist
George Thomas Tilden (1845–1919), American architect
Geraldine Tilden, American curler
Guy Tilden (1858–1929), American architect
Jane Tilden (1910–2002), Austrian actress 
John Henry Tilden (1851-1940), American physician
Josephine Tilden (1869–1957), American scientist
Leif Tilden (born 1964), American actor 
Mark Tilden (born 1961), Canadian robotics physicist
Philip Tilden (1887–1956), British architect
Samuel J. Tilden (1814–1886), American politician and candidate in the highly contested 1876 Presidential election
Samuel Tilden Norton (1877–1959), American architect
William A. Tilden (1842–1926), British chemist

See also
Tilden (disambiguation)
Tylden (disambiguation)

Surnames